John Eric Paul Mitchell (born 23 March 1964) is a New Zealand rugby union coach and former player. He is currently defence coach for the Japan national team.

Playing career

Early career
Born 23 March 1964 in Hāwera, New Zealand, Mitchell was a pupil at Francis Douglas Memorial College in New Plymouth when he made the first XV; he was a member of the NZ secondary schools basketball team from 1981–83. He represented NZ Juniors in basketball in 1982–83, but then decided to concentrate on rugby. From here, he earned a place at King Country RFU aged 19 before playing for Fraser-Tech from 1984. He was soon selected provincially for the Waikato Colts.

Provincial
He made his Waikato senior debut in 1985 and played at number eight, blindside flanker and lock before he became firmly established at number eight. Equal top scorer in first division rugby in 1989–90, he thus scored more tries over these seasons than any other NZ first division player.

Mitchell was given the Waikato captaincy in 1989. In 1990, because of a broken leg, he could only play half the games. He was reappointed captain in 1991 and led from that time on until his retirement just prior to the start of the 1995 season. Overall, he played 134 games for Waikato, including a record 86 times as captain, scoring 335 points from 67 tries. In the off-season, Mitchell played club rugby in France and Ireland, which included a stint with Garryowen in the All-Ireland League. He was part of the team that finished second in the 1990–91 season to Cork Constitution.

All Blacks
Though Mitchell never played for the All Blacks at test level, he did represent the team on 6 occasions in 1993. He travelled as part of the 1993 tour of Britain squad, where he featured in six uncapped matches. His first was against a Midland Division side on 26 October 1993 where the All Blacks came out victors 12–6. He later captained the side three times, all resulting in victories - against a Scottish Development XV 31–12, England Emerging Players 30–19 and Combined Services 13–3.

Honours
Waikato
National Provincial Championship
Winners: 1986 (Second division), 1992 (First division)

Coaching

Despite not retiring from playing until 1995, Mitchell featured as a player/coach at Fraser Tech until his retirement. When Murray Kidd was named the new Ireland coach in 1995, he hired Mitchell as a technical adviser/forwards coach in January 1996.

In May 1996, he was brought into Sale Sharks by coach Paul Turner who later stood down at the end of the 1995–96 season. Mitchell subsequently became in charge of Sale until 1999. Following problems at Sale, his contract was bought out and he left the club.

In 1997, Mitchell was targeted by newly appointed head coach of England, Clive Woodward, to be the new forwards coach. He left the national set-up in 2000.

New Zealand
In late 2000 Mitchell returned to New Zealand for his appointment as the new head coach of the Chiefs in the Super 12, and he led the side to sixth in the table.

In October 2001, Mitchell was named the head coach of the New Zealand national side.
Just a month after being appointed as head coach, Mitchell's first match in charge was against Ireland in Dublin, which saw the All Blacks win 40–29, before going onto beat Scotland 37–6, and Argentina 24–20. In 2002, Mitchell was unable to lead the All Blacks to reclaim the Bledisloe Cup, having not won the trophy since 1997. The All Blacks reclaimed the trophy a year later, however, winning both games.

Mitchell led the All Blacks to a third-place finish at the 2003 Rugby World Cup, with victories over Italy, Canada, Tonga and Wales in the group stage to finish top of Pool D. The All Blacks beat the Springboks 29–9 in the quarterfinals, but lost to hosts Australia in the semifinal 22–10. Following that loss, Mitchell lost his job as All Blacks coach. The NZRU cited Mitchell's difficult relationships with the media and with sponsors as the main reasons for searching for other head coaching candidates, rather than the performance of the team.

International matches as head coach 
Note: World Rankings Column shows the World Ranking New Zealand was placed at on the following Monday after each of their matches

Record by country

Honors
Rugby World Cup / Webb Ellis Cup
Third: 2003 Rugby World Cup
Tri Nations Series
Winners: 2002, 2003
Bledisloe Cup
Winners: 2003
Dave Gallaher Trophy
Winners: 2002, 2003

Waikato
After leaving the All Blacks, Mitchell took over Waikato ahead of the 2004 National Provincial Championship. In his first season in charge, Waikato bowed out at the Semi Finals after losing to Wellington 28–16, while in 2005, they failed to make the play-offs at all, finishing seventh after the regular season.

Western Force
In 2006, Mitchell became the first ever New Zealander to coach an Australia Super Rugby franchise when he took over the Western Force in their debut season of the expanded Super 14. In their first season they finished last with just a single victory, coming in Round 13 against the Cheetahs, winning 16–14. In their second season, they jumped up to seventh on the table picking up 6 victories before falling back down the table across the 2008, 2009 and 2010 seasons. Mitchell was released as coach in 2010.

South Africa
Mitchell took up a role in South Africa as Golden Lions head coach, before returning to the Super Rugby in 2011 with the Lions. On 29 October 2011 it was Kiwi against Kiwi in the 2011 Currie Cup final when Mitchell's Golden Lions hosted a star-studded The Sharks rugby team under fellow Kiwi John Plumtree in Johannesburg. The  team included the full Springbok front row as well as seven more Springboks. The Golden Lions won the match 42–16 to win their first Currie Cup Championship in 12 years and also winning their first Currie Cup title on their home field in 61 years.

On 22 June 2012, he was suspended after complaints from Lions players regarding the manner in which they were treated by Mitchell. In November, he was found not guilty of all charges against him and reinstated as Lions head coach. However, on 23 November 2012, he quit as coach to take over as a technical adviser at the Lions. On 28 November 2012 after two seasons with the Lions, Mitchell then accepted a position at Sale Sharks in the UK towards the end of 2012. However, on 29 December 2012, Sale announced Mitchell had returned to South Africa citing "personal reasons".

Mitchell claimed he was offered the job to coach Scotland and he turned down the offer in 2013. On 11 September 2013, Mitchell was named head coach of UKZN in the Varsity Cup.

Following the 2015 Rugby World Cup, Mitchell applied for the vacant head coach position of the England national team, but failed to be selected for the role, with Eddie Jones being the preferred candidate.

United States
USA Rugby announced Mitchell on 4 January 2016 as the new head coach of the USA Eagles, taking over from Mike Tolkin on a four-year contract. Mitchell's hiring was questioned, given that Mitchell had stated he was not interested in working for a "minor" side such as Tonga or Scotland.

Mitchell's first match in charge was an uncapped match against Argentina XV in the inaugural Americas Rugby Championship. The game was drawn 35–35 in a game that included 11 uncapped players in the USA's team. Those 11 uncapped players were later officially capped a week later when Mitchell led USA to a 30–22 victory over Canada, the American's fourth consecutive victory over the Canadians. On 20 February, USA went top of the table with a 64–0 victory over Chile, however the States failed to keep hold of that position a week later when they were surprisingly beaten by Brazil in Barueri 24–23, with a last minute penalty to the Brazilians. It was the first ever meeting between the two nations, with Brazil earning their first ever victory over a tier 2 nation. On 5 March, Uruguay earned their first victory over the Americans since 2002, when they defeated the Eagles 29–25 in Montevideo. USA finished the Championship in second place with 15 points, 7 points behind Champions Argentina XV.

In June 2016, the United States put up a convincing display against Italy, going down 24–20. A week later, the United States beat rivals Russia 25–0. During the 2016 November internationals, Mitchell handed 6 players their international debut, across two test matches. The United States lost both test matches, 23–10 to Romania and 20–17 to Tonga. They were also defeated by the Māori All Blacks 54–7 at Toyota Park.

In March 2017, Mitchell led the United States to their first ever Americas Rugby Championship title, with victories over Brazil (51–3), Canada (51–34), Chile (57–9) and Uruguay (29–23) heading into the final week. Both the United States and Argentina XV were level on points leading into the Championship decider in the final week, which saw them draw for the second consecutive year - a bonus-point try in overtime to level the score and see the United States finish with 22 points on the table to Argentina's 21.

Several problems emerged with Mitchell's coaching. Mitchell refused to relocate to the United States, attempting to coach the team from his home in South Africa. Mitchell also refused to help American rugby coaches develop.
It was announced in late May 2017 that Mitchell would leave the USA Eagles after their 2019 Rugby World Cup Qualifiers play-offs against Canada in July, so he could return to the Blue Bulls. His last four-match campaign as the Eagles head coach saw Mitchell win just one game, with two losses and a draw. Their two losses came as part of the June international window, a 55–19 loss to Ireland before a first ever loss to Georgia at home, 21–17. Despite this, Mitchell helped the United States qualify for the 2019 Rugby World Cup as Americas 1, the first time they had done so with previous attempts seeing the States qualify as Americas 2 or 3. This came after they drew the first leg, Canada at home, 28–28, before the return fixture the following week in San Diego, which saw the Eagles win 52–16.

Mitchell left the United States with a 53% win rate, 8-7-1 in sixteen test matches. During his tenure, the U.S. lost to lowly-ranked Brazil in 2016, and the U.S. dropped in the World Rugby Rankings from 16th to 17th. In 2017 he led the Eagles to winning the Americas Rugby Championship, the US first major tournament victory since the 1924 Olympics.

International matches as head coach

Honours
Americas Rugby Championship
Winners: 2017
Runners-up: 2016

Bulls / Blue Bulls

In August 2017, he also replaced Marais as the head coach of the Blue Bulls Currie Cup side.

In what turned out to be his only season with the Blue Bulls and Bulls, he led the Currie Cup side to fourth on the table by the end of the regular season with five from twelve victories. However, in the semi-final, Mitchell's side lost to the Sharks 37–27 to fail to advance to the final for a second consecutive year. In Super Rugby, Mitchell failed to make a vast improvement of the side, seeing his team finish twelfth on the table with just six victories.

England
In September 2018, Mitchell left his post with the South African franchise, and became defensive coach for the England national team.

Japan
In February 2022, Mitchell joined Japan as defence coach

Personal life
His son Daryl has played international cricket for New Zealand.

References

External links
 

1964 births
New Zealand international rugby union players
Living people
People educated at Francis Douglas Memorial College
New Zealand rugby union coaches
New Zealand rugby union players
New Zealand national rugby union team coaches
Rugby union in Western Australia
Rugby union players from Hāwera
Waikato rugby union players
United States national rugby union team coaches
Western Force coaches
Rugby union flankers
Rugby union number eights
Rugby union locks
New Zealand expatriate sportspeople in England